The Ryan VZ-3 Vertiplane, also known by the company designation Ryan Model 92 was an American experimental vertical/short take-off (VSTOL) aircraft built by the Ryan Aeronautical Company for the United States Army.

Design and development
The VZ-3 was a simple proof-of-concept experimental aircraft using blown flaps to achieve a short or near vertical take-off. It was a high-wing monoplane powered by an Avco Lycoming T53 turboshaft engine located inside the fuselage driving two large-diameter propellers mounted, one on each wing. It had a T-tail and originally a tailwheel fixed landing gear. It had wide-span double retractable trailing-edge flaps, these were extended into the propeller slipstream for takeoff. To enable control while in the hover it had a universally-jointed jet-deflection nozzle at the rear of the aircraft. It was later modified with a nose-wheel landing gear.

The VZ-3 could make a near-vertical takeoff within 30 ft (9m) at a speed of 25 mph (40 km/h) and the aircraft could be put into the hover up to a height of 3,700 ft (1,100 m).

Operational history
The aircraft conducted a 21-flight test program for the United States Army until it crashed in 1959. It was rebuilt with an open cockpit lengthened fuselage and handed over to NASA for further trials. Following retirement the VZ-3 is on display at the United States Army Aviation Museum.

Operator

United States Army
NASA

Specifications

See also

References
Notes

Bibliography

 Andrade, John M. U.S. Military Aircraft Designations and Serials since 1909. Earl Shilton, Leicester, UK: Midland Counties Publications, 1979, p. 178. .
 The Illustrated Encyclopedia of Aircraft (Part Work 1982-1985). London: Orbis Publishing, 1985, p. 2837.
 Taylor, John W.R. Jane's Pocket Book of Research and Experimental Aircraft, London, Macdonald and Jane's Publishers Ltd, 1976. .

External links

 "Vertiplane Really Puts Flaps Down." Popular Mechanics, April 1960, p. 128.

Z-03 Vertiplane
VZ-3
NASA aircraft
Single-engined twin-prop tractor aircraft
High-wing aircraft
Turboshaft-powered aircraft
Aircraft first flown in 1958
T-tail aircraft
STOL aircraft
VTOL aircraft